The Sunburst Shelter, designated by the survey number 3MR94, is an archaeological site in Marion County, Arkansas.  A notable feature of the site is a pictograph depicting a sunburst.  Painted in red pigment onto a limestone surface with fingers, the pictograph was described as being in fair condition in 2003, with flaking paint and water staining, and some vandalism to the area.

The site was listed on the National Register of Historic Places in 1982.

See also
National Register of Historic Places listings in Marion County, Arkansas

References

External links
Image of the pictograph

Archaeological sites on the National Register of Historic Places in Arkansas
National Register of Historic Places in Marion County, Arkansas
Petroglyphs in Arkansas
Native American history of Arkansas